John Panonetsa Mangudya (born 5 October 1963) is the governor of the Reserve Bank of Zimbabwe. He was appointed in March 2014 by the then Zimbabwean president, Robert Mugabe, and began his tenure as governor on 1 May that year. He succeeded Gideon Gono as the governor of Zimbabwe's central bank and became the nation's 6th substantial exchequer.

Early life and education
Mangudya was born in the Mutambara area of Chimanimani, in Manicaland, the youngest of twelve children.

Mangudya earned bachelor's and master's degrees in economics from the University of Zimbabwe, where he won several book prizes for his academic achievements. He also has a PhD in Economics from Washington International University. His PhD qualification however, has been questioned by critics who have noted that it was obtained from an unaccredited institution in the United States.

Reserve Bank of Zimbabwe governorship 
John Mangudya started work as RBZ governor on 1 May 2014 after being appointed into office by Robert Mugabe. He took over from Charity Dhliwayo who had been acting since November 2013 following Gideon Gono's retirement. In May 2019, his expired contract was renewed for a further 5 years by Emmerson Mnangagwa.

Bond notes and coins 
A few months after assuming office, Mangudya introduced bond notes at that time stated not to be a currency, but a legal tender pegged to be with the same value as the US dollar. The coins were introduced to remedy a lack of small change. In November 2016, Mangudya also introduced bond notes, pegged at the same value as the US Dollar again. Bond notes and coins later started losing value against the US dollar and even though the banks and formal institutions kept the rate at 1:1, the case was not the same on the parallel market (black market). Bond notes were introduced to ease cash shortages in the country.

Use of plastic money 
John Mangudya is also the one who encouraged use of plastic money (bank cards, mobile banking and internet banking) in Zimbabwe following the cash shortages that were heavily affecting the country. To do this he lowered charges on using electronic means to settle transactions.

RTGS Dollar 
The bond notes and coins continued losing value against the US dollar on the parallel market and this led Mangudya to the introduce a new currency, the RTGS Dollar in February 2019. The RTGS dollar was introduced to bring sanity in the foreign currency market, promote diaspora remittances, protect foreign investments and exports.

Career profile

Personal life
Mangudya is married to Tapiwa Mangudya and they have three children. He is a member of the United Methodist Church.

References

Living people
Governors of the Reserve Bank of Zimbabwe
1963 births
University of Zimbabwe alumni
People using unaccredited degrees